Nedungadappally is a village in between Mallappally and Karukachal in Kerala, India. It is part of Thiruvalla constituency. It comes under Mallappally Block. It is near the boundary of Kottayam and Pathanamthitta districts.

Schools 
 CMS High school Nedungadappally
 St. Philomina's UP School 
 CMS LP School Nedungadappally 
 St. Thomas CSI English medium School

References

Villages in Kottayam district
Changanassery